Khu Khot is a tambon (sub-district) in Lam Luk Ka district of Pathum Thani province, Greater Bangkok.

History
Originally, Sai Mai used to be a muban (village) in the area of Khu Khot. Later, it was separated as part of Bang Khen district, Bangkok. Until now, it has become a full Sai Mai district. 

The term Khu Khot, directly translated as "meandered ditch".

Vietnam Airlines Flight 831 crashed into a paddy field in Khu Khot on September 9, 1988.

Geography

The area bounded by other places (from the north clockwise): Rangsit in Thanyaburi district, Lat Sawai in its district, Sanam Bin in Don Mueang district and Sai Mai in Sai Mai district (Bangkok), with Lak Hok in Mueang Pathum Thani district, respectively.

Khu Khot has total area of 24.975 km2 (9.642 mi2).

Administration
Khu Khot is further divided into 18 administrative villages.

The sub-district also governed by two local governments: Khu Khot Town Municipality and Lam Sam Kaeo Town Municipality.

Population
In 2018, it had total population of 110,750 people (45,009 in  Khu Khot Town Municipality, 65,741 in Lam Sam Kaeo Town Municipality).

Transportation
Khu Khot is served by the Khu Khot Station, the last stop on Sukhumvit line (Light Green line) of the BTS skytrain.

Phaholyothin (National Highway 1) and Vibhavadi Rangsit Roads (National Highway 31), with Lam Luk Ka Road (National Highway 3312) are the main thoroughfare.

Places
Si Mum Mueang Market, the largest agricultural distribution centre in the country
Thai National Memorial
Thupatemi Stadium, the official stadium of the Royal Thai Air Force (RTAF)
Zeer Rangsit, IT equipment store
PatRangsit Hospital, the first private hospital in Pathum Thani

Cites

Tambon of Pathum Thani Province